This is a list of man-made disasters in the Philippines. This includes only acts that were not deliberately perpetrated and involved significant damage or loss of life.

Aerial disasters
 March 17, 1957 – 1957 Cebu Douglas C-47 crash. A C-47 Skytrain transport aircraft flying from Cebu to Manila crashed on the slopes of Mount Manunggal in Balamban, Cebu. The crash killed 25 of the aircraft's 26 occupants, including President Ramon Magsaysay. Several government officials, military officers, and journalists also died. The sole survivor was a reporter for the Philippine Herald, Nestor Mata.
 November 23, 1960 – Philippine Airlines Flight S26. A Douglas DC-3 flying from Mandurriao Airport in Iloilo to Manila International Airport crashed into Mount Baco in Mindoro, killing all 33 on board.
 September 12, 1969 – Philippine Airlines Flight 158. A BAC One-Eleven flying from Mactan–Cebu International Airport to Manila, struck a mango tree on a hill in Antipolo while on final approach. Of the 42 passengers and five crew members on board, only one passenger and one flight attendant survived.
 June 26, 1987 – Philippine Airlines Flight 206. A Hawker Siddeley HS 748 flying from Manila to Loakan Airport, Baguio crashed into Mount Ugu, located between Itogon, Benguet and Kayapa, Nueva Vizcaya, killing all 50 people on board.
 December 19, 1987 – Philippine Airlines Flight 443. All 15 people aboard a Short 360-300 flying from Cebu to Iligan-Maria Cristina Airport died when it crashed into Mount Gurain in Balindong, Lanao del Sur.
 May 11, 1990 – Philippine Airlines Flight 143. A Boeing 737–300 flying from Ninoy Aquino International Airport (NAIA) to Iloilo City suffered an explosion in the central fuel tank and was consumed by fire in four minutes. 8 people on board died.
 May 18, 1990 – Aerolift Philippines Flight 075. A Beechcraft 1900 flying from NAIA to Surigao Airport crashed just after takeoff, killing all 19 passengers and 2 crew, as well as a family of four on the ground. 
 February 2, 1998 – Cebu Pacific Flight 387. A McDonnell Douglas DC-9-32 flying from NAIA to Lumbia Airport in Cagayan de Oro crashed on the slopes of Mount Sumagaya in Gingoog, Misamis Oriental. The incident resulted in the deaths of all 104 passengers and crew on board.
 March 22, 1998 – Philippine Airlines Flight 137. An Airbus A320-214 overshot the runway while landing at Bacolod City Domestic Airport. There were no fatalities among the crew and passengers, but three people died on the ground as the plane plowed through a residential area.
 December 7, 1999 – Asian Spirit Flight 100. A Let L-410 Turbolet flying from NAIA to Cauayan, Isabela crashed into a mountain between Kasibu, Nueva Vizcaya and Cabarroguis, Quirino. All fifteen passengers and two crew died.
 April 19, 2000 – Air Philippines Flight 541. A Boeing 737-2H4 flying from NAIA to Francisco Bangoy International Airport in Davao City crashed in Samal, Davao del Norte while on final approach, killing all 124 passengers and 7 crew members.
 November 11, 2002 – Laoag International Airlines Flight 585. A Fokker F-27 Friendship flying from NAIA to Basco, Batanes crashed into Manila Bay shortly after takeoff.  Of the 34 passengers and crew on board, 19 died.
 December 10, 2011 – 2011 Manila Beechcraft Queen Air crash. A twin-engine Beechcraft Queen Air light aircraft crashed into a slum and burst into flames in Parañaque City, killing all three people on board and eleven on the ground. Twenty more people on the ground were injured.
 August 28, 2012 – 2012 Philippines Piper Seneca crash. A Piper PA-34 Seneca light aircraft with four people on board, including Interior Secretary Jesse Robredo, crashed in the sea near Masbate, while flying from Lapu-Lapu City to Naga, Camarines Sur. Robredo and two other occupants were killed in the accident.
 March 17, 2018 – 2018 Philippines Piper PA-23 crash. A Piper PA-23 Apache crashed into a residential area in Plaridel, Bulacan, killing all five people (three passengers and two pilots) on board and five others on the ground.
 September 1, 2019 – 2019 Philippines Beechcraft King Air crash. A Beechcraft King Air 350 crashed into a resort in Calamba, Laguna, while on a medevac flight from Dipolog to Manila. All nine occupants aboard were killed.
 July 4, 2021 – 2021 Philippine Air Force C-130 crash. A Lockheed C-130 Hercules of the Philippine Air Force (PAF) crashed after an attempted landing at Jolo Airport in Sulu. 53 died, of which 50 people were on the aircraft and 3 on the ground.

Maritime disasters

Road transportation disasters
 September 2, 1954 – Fabrica train crash. A timber train carrying more than 100 passengers derailed and multiple wagons fell off a bridge in the village of Fabrica in Sagay, Negros Occidental. At least 82 people were killed. 
 January 6, 1967 – 1967 Cavite bus crash. Two Catholic pilgrimage buses plunged off a cliff near a reinforced timber bridge in Indang after colliding with each other on a mountainous road, killing more than 80 people.
 June 13, 2010 – 2010 Balamban, Cebu bus accident. 21 passengers, most of them Iranian students, died when their bus fell off a 30-foot ravine.
 October 19, 2013 – 2013 Atimonan road crash. Three buses and four trucks collided in Quezon ; 20 were killed and 54 injured.
 December 16, 2013 –  2013 Metro Manila Skyway bus accident. A bus fell off the Metro Manila Skyway in Parañaque City, killing 18 and injuring 20.
 February 7, 2014 – 2014 Mountain Province bus accident. 17 passengers killed when their bus fell off a 150-meter ravine in Bontoc.
 February 20, 2017 – 2017 Tanay bus accident. A tourist bus carrying more than 50 passengers lost control and hit an electric post in Rizal. 15 people were killed and 40 injured.
 April 18, 2017 – 2017 Nueva Ecija bus accident. A 45-seater bus carrying 77 passengers fell into a ravine in Carranglan, killing 31 and injuring 46.

Fires
 February 7, 1966 – 1966 Iloilo City fire. A massive fire destroyed nearly three quarters of the central business district of Iloilo City. 
 March 18, 1998 – Ozone Disco fire. 162 people, mostly students celebrating the end of the academic term, died in a nightclub fire in Quezon City.
 August 18, 2001 – Manor Hotel fire. 74 people died in a hotel fire in Quezon City.
 May 13, 2015 – Kentex slipper factory fire. 74 people died in a factory fire in Valenzuela City. 
 February 1, 2017 – HTI factory fire. 5 people died after a factory fire inside the Cavite Export Processing Zone in General Trias, Cavite.
 December 23, 2017 – 2017 Davao City mall fire. 39 people died in a fire that destroyed the New City Commercial Center (NCCC) shopping mall.
 March 18, 2018 – 2018 Manila Pavilion Hotel fire. 6 people died in a hotel fire in the Ermita district of Manila.

Structural and Infrastructure failures

Environmental disasters
 March 24, 1996 – Marcopper mining disaster. A fracture in the drainage tunnel of a large pit containing leftover mine tailings belonging to a Canadian firm led to a discharge of toxic mine waste into the Makulapnit-Boac river system in Marinduque, causing flash flooding, extensive contamination, adverse health effects and the biological death of the river system.
 August 11, 2006 – Guimaras oil spill. An oil tanker, MT Solar 1, sank off the coasts of Guimaras and Negros Occidental, causing some 500,000 litres (110,000 imp gal; 130,000 US gal) of oil to pour into Panay Gulf in an oil spill.

Miscellaneous
 February 4, 2006 – PhilSports Arena Stampede. 78 died in a crush at the venue of the first anniversary celebrations of ABS-CBN's variety show Wowowee in Pasig City.

See also
List of disasters in the Philippines, for natural disasters in the Philippines

References

Philippines
 
Disasters